Wilbur Heights is an unincorporated community in Champaign County, Illinois, United States. Wilbur Heights is a northern suburb of Champaign and Urbana.

Bordered by Market Street, Wallace, and 5th street, this  neighborhood is currently zoned as "industrial". It is surrounded by companies such as Illini Recycling, Sport's Redi-mix, Judson Baptist Chapel, and The Salvation Army. Also nearby is a volunteer fire department.

Since it is unincorporated from the city, it has limited snow removal services.
Many vacant homes and lots are for sale.

References

Unincorporated communities in Champaign County, Illinois
Unincorporated communities in Illinois